Manuel Medina is the name of:

Manuel Medina (boxer) (born 1971), Mexican boxer
Manuel Medina (cyclist) (born 1976), Venezuelan professional racing cyclist
Manuel Medina (politician) (born 1935), Spanish politician
Manuel Hidalgo Medina (born 1968), medical oncologist
Manuel D. Medina (born 1955), tech entrepreneur in Florida